Peter Gowdy is an English singer-songwriter.

Gowdy was the singer-songwriter of the now disbanded London-based rock group, Ivory Circus.  In 2009, Gowdy's song "Turning on My Radio" won XFM London Radio's band competition.   In November 2010, Gowdy was profiled by Future Sounds.

References

External links
 

Year of birth missing (living people)
Place of birth missing (living people)
Living people
English male singer-songwriters